Hellmut von Leipzig (18 July 1921 — 24 October 2016) was an officer (Leutnant) of the Brandenburgers in the Wehrmacht during World War II. He was a recipient of the Knight's Cross of the Iron Cross of Nazi Germany. Following the war, von Leipzig became involved in leadership roles in the German-speaking community in Namibia.

Biography
Leipzig was born in South West Africa, son of a naval officer. In 1941, he volunteered for the Afrika Korps. He became driver to Generalfeldmarschall Erwin Rommel, whom Leipzig describes as "the craziest passenger ever", because he always said "Faster!" and when encountering an enemy's minefield, would insist on going and personally guiding Leipzig around the mines. Leipzig fought in the "Battle of Berlin", became a POW in 1945 and spent 10 years in Soviet captivity.

In later life he resided in Namibia, where he founded the German Cultural Council, the largest organisation of the German-speaking community in Namibia. He chaired the organisation from 1986 to 1997. He also sat on the board of The Association of German School Societies in Namibia (AGDS). Leipzig died in Namibia in October 2016 at the age of 95.

Awards

 Knight's Cross of the Iron Cross on 28 April 1945 as Leutnant of the Reserves and Zugführer (platoon leader) in the Panzer-Aufklärungs-Abteilung "Brandenburg"
 Order of Saint John (Bailiwick of Brandenburg)

References

Bibliography

 

1921 births
2016 deaths
Namibian people of German descent
People from Keetmanshoop
Recipients of the Knight's Cross of the Iron Cross
White Namibian people
German Army officers of World War II
German prisoners of war in World War II held by the Soviet Union